Labatut (French pronunciation: [labaty]) may refer to:

Places
in France

Labatut, Ariège, a commune in the Ariège department 
Labatut, Landes, a commune in the Landes department 
Labatut-Figuières, formerly Labatut, a commune in the Pyrénées-Atlantiques department
Labatut-Rivière, [labaty ʁivjɛʁ]; Occitan: L'Abatut) is a commune in the Hautes-Pyrénées department

in the United States
Labatut (New Roads, Louisiana), listed on the NRHP in Louisiana

Other
Labatut (surname)